Hugh John Vaughan Campbell, 6th Earl Cawdor (6 September 1932 – 20 June 1993), was a Scottish peer and land-owner, a member of the House of Lords from 1970 until his death.

Biography
Campbell was the son of John Campbell, 5th Earl Cawdor, and Wilma Mairi Vickers. He studied at Eton College, Magdalen College, Oxford, and the Royal Agricultural College, Cirencester.

He held the office of High Sheriff of Carmarthenshire in 1964. Although Scottish, he lived at Golden Grove, Llandeilo, in Wales, until his father's death in 1970, when he inherited the family estates in Scotland, some 50,000 acres.

Marriages and children
Lord Cawdor was married firstly on 19 January 1956 to Cathryn Hinde, daughter of Major-General Sir Robert Hinde DSO KBE CB, and his wife Evelyn Muriel Wright. They had five children:

 Lady Emma Clare Campbell (born 15 March 1958); married David Marrian on 29 January 1983, and has three sons.
 Lady Elizabeth Campbell (born 24 September 1959); married William Robert Charles Athill in 1990, and has one daughter and one son. Their daughter, Storm, married Richard Hollingsworth in September 2021.
 Colin Robert Vaughan Campbell, 7th Earl Cawdor (born 30 June 1962); married Lady Isabella Rachel Stanhope, daughter of William Stanhope, 11th Earl of Harrington, on 21 October 1994, and had issue, including Lady Jean Campbell.
 Hon. Frederick William Campbell (born 29 July 1965); married Katherine J. M. Barrett on 7 December 1996, and has one daughter and one son, Imogen Grace Campbell (born 23 September 1999) and Jasper Hugh Campbell (born 26 September 2000).
 Lady Laura Jane Campbell (born 26 December 1966); married Adam Hall in 2000, divorced in 2013.

Cawdor and Cathryn Hinde were divorced in 1979 and he was married secondly to Angelica Countess Lazansky von Bukowa on 28 December 1979. She is an advocate for organic gardening and farming.  There were no children of the second marriage.

Cawdor died on 20 June 1993. He caused controversy by leaving Cawdor Castle to his second wife rather than his heir.  One of his daughters, Lady Elizabeth (Liza), published her memoir of him in 2006, called Title Deeds: a Work of Friction.

References

External links

1932 births
1993 deaths
Earls in the Peerage of the United Kingdom
6
High Sheriffs of Carmarthenshire
People educated at Eton College